Kuhveriya is a 1998 Maldivian drama film edited and directed by Mohamed Rasheed. Produced by Villager Maldives, the film stars Moosa Zakariyya, Ismail Hilmy, Aishath Jaleel and Zeenath Abbas in pivotal roles.

Premise
A happily married couple, Nimal and Zeeniya (Ismail Hilmy and Aishath Jaleel) along with their daughter like sister, Reema, go on vacation where Zeeniya disappears. Although the civilians search the whole island, she is nowhere to be found and is pronounced to be dead. Years later, Reema now fully grown up, visits Male' from abroad and is romantically attracted to Nimal's brother, Shaheem (Moosa Zakariyya). Complications arise, when a servant is brought into the house who surprisingly looks similar to Zeeniya.

Cast 
 Moosa Zakariyya as Shaheem
 Ismail Hilmy as Nimal
 Aishath Jaleel as Zeeniya
 Zeenath Abbas as Reema
 Ageela Naeem
 Ahmed Rasheed
 Ali Hussain
 Abdulla Yoosuf
 Ibrahim Rasheed
 Hafeez
 Saajan

Soundtrack

References

1998 films
Maldivian drama films
Films directed by Mohamed Rasheed
1998 drama films
Dhivehi-language films